The 2005–06 Moldovan Cup was the 15th season of the Moldovan annual football cup competition. The competition ended with the final held on 10 May 2006.

Round of 16
The first legs were played on 28 September 2005. The second legs were played on 19 October 2005.

|}

Quarter-finals
The first legs were played on 3 November 2005. The second legs were played on 10 November 2005.

|}

Semi-finals
The first legs were played on 5 April 2006. The second legs were played on 13 April 2006.

|}

Final

References
 
 
 

Moldovan Cup seasons
Moldovan Cup
Moldova